The 1965 Nobel Peace Prize was awarded to the United Nations agency United Nations Children's Fund (UNICEF) (founded in 1946) "for its effort to enhance solidarity between nations and reduce the difference between rich and poor states." The agency became the eighth organization awarded with a Nobel Prize.

Laureate

UNICEF is the successor of the United Nations International Children's Emergency Fund, created on 11 December 1946, in New York, by the U.N. Relief Rehabilitation Administration to provide emergency relief to children and mothers affected by World War II. That same year, the U.N. General Assembly established the agency to further institutionalize post-war relief work, focusing later on providing food, clothing, and medicine to mothers and children in war-torn Europe, China and Palestine. The organization began setting longer-term goals for emerging nations at the beginning of the 1950s. It introduced initiatives for mothers and newborns, provided dietary guidance, supplied vitamin-rich food, and fought diseases. In support of these initiatives, UNICEF established projects to guarantee children's and adolescents' attendance at school as well as thousands of health stations throughout the developing globe. The organization's work was strengthened when the U.N. adopted a Declaration of the Rights of the Child in 1959. The Norwegian Nobel Committee believes that UNICEF's initiatives were a turning point in international cooperation that lessened the gap between wealthy and developing countries, and the threat of war.

Deliberations

Nominations
UNICEF received twelve nominations in total since 1950. In 1965, it earned three distinct nominations from two Norgian politicians (Berte Rognerud and Gudmund Harlem) and 4 members of the Yoguslavian parliament.

In total, the Norwegian Nobel Committee received 78 nominations 24 individuals and 7 organizations such as Vinoba Bhave, Martin Buber (who died months before the announcement), Norman Cousins, Danilo Dolci, Institut de Droit International (awarded in 1904) and Universal Esperanto Association. Nine of the nominees were nominated for the first time such as Pope Paul VI, Shigeru Yoshida, U Thant, Galo Plaza, Arne Geijer and The Salvation Army. No women were nominated that year. Notable figures like Viola Desmond, Nikolaus Ehlen, Leopold Figl, Felix Frankfurter and Malcolm X died in 1965 without having been nominated for the peace prize while the American politician Adlai Stevenson II died before the only chance to be rewarded.

Norwegian Nobel Committee
The following members of the Norwegian Nobel Committee appointed by the Storting were responsible for the selection of the 1965 Nobel laureate in accordance with the will of Alfred Nobel:

Notes

References

External links

1965
UNICEF